Corazón Profundo (English: Deep Heart) is the thirteenth studio album by Colombian recording artist Carlos Vives, released by Sony Music on April 23, 2013. This was Vives's first studio album since 2009's Clásicos de la Provincia II and the first to feature all-new material since 2004's El Rock de Mi Pueblo. He was also away from the music industry Sony Music and returns after 20 years when he made the album Escalona: Vol. 2 in 1992.

The album's first single, "Volví a Nacer" was released on September 24, 2012. It peaked at #1 on the Colombian National-Report, US Billboard Latin Pop Songs and US Billboard Hot Latin Songs charts. The second single, "Como Le Gusta A Tu Cuerpo", featuring the Brazilian musician Michel Teló, was released on January 22, 2013 and peaked at #3 in the US Billboard Hot Latin Songs chart. The third single from the album, "Bailar Contigo", was released on May 5, 2013.

Promotion

Singles 
"Volví a Nacer" was released as the lead single of the album. The single debuted at the top of the Billboard Hot Latin Songs chart dated on the week of October 4, 2012 thanks to heavy airplay, giving Carlos Vives his fifth number one single on the chart.
The same week the song peaked at number one in Colombia, Mexico and Venezuela.

"Como Le Gusta A Tu Cuerpo" was released as the second single on January 22, 2013 and featured the Brazilian artist Michel Teló.

"Bailar Contigo" was released to Colombian radio stations on May 5, 2013.

"La Foto de los Dos" was released on October, 2013.

Como Le Gusta a Mi Pueblo Tour 

Como Le Gusta a Mi Pueblo Tour is the concert tour by Vives in support of his thirteenth studio album Corazón Profundo. The tour started in Puerto Rico and continued in many US cities.

Reception

Critical response 

Corazón Profundo has received generally positive reviews from critics. At About.com's Carlos Quintana opined that "I have to say the album has left me with mixed feelings. While I like the romantic vibes in this album and the more traditional sound of tracks like 'Hoy Me Desperte en Otro Lugar', I really did not enjoy some of the commercial stuff that Carlos Vives added here". David Jeffries from Allmusic gave the album three and a half stars (out of five), saying to "expect nostalgic numbers and romantic songs, along with some modern, polished pop" and highlighting the new sound with the song "Como Le Gusta a Tu Cuerpo" and the smash hit "Volvi a Nacer".

Commercial performance 
Corazón Profundo debuted at number one on the National-Report album chart in Colombia with first-day sales of 35,000 copies. In its first week the album had sold more than 200,000 copies and was certified diamond. In the United States, the album debuted at number 61 on the Billboard 200 and at number one on the Latin Albums chart, spending two weeks there. In Venezuela the album sold 5,000 copies on the day of its release and was certified gold by the APFV. The album debuted at #10 in Spain, at #43 in Mexico and at #2 in Argentina.

Track listing 

Deluxe Version

Personnel

Carlos Vives – lead and backing vocals
Ramón Benítez – euphonium
Pablo Bernal – drums
Andrés Castro – guitars, keyboards
Egidio Cuadrado – accordion
Juan Deluque – backing vocals
Guianko Gómez – backing vocals
Dany Henao – backing vocals
John Lozano – accordion
Carlos Iván Medina – keyboards
Mayte Montero – gaita, percussion
Luis Angel "El Papa" Pastor – bass
Eder Polo – guacharaca
Alfredo Rosado – snare drum
Rodny Terán – percussion
Robert Vilera – percussion
Pete Wallace – keyboards

Violins – Aldo Cappicchoni, Enrico Gramigna, Gioele Sindon, Francesca Cuadrelli, Claudio Castagnoli, Nicoletta Bassetti
Violas – Aldo Maria Zangheri, Manuela Tromboni
Cellos – Cecilia Biondini, Cecilia Amadori
Michel Teló – accordion on "Como Le Gusta a Tu Cuerpo"
Dan Warner – guitar solo on "Hoy Me Desperté"

Production
Arranged by Andrés Castro and Carlos Vives except "Como Le Gusta a Tu Cuerpo" arranged by Andrés Castro, Carlos Vives, Dudu Borges and Michel Teló
Produced by Andrés Castro and Carlos Vives

Charts

Weekly charts

Year-end charts

Certifications

!scope="row"|Colombia (ASINCOL)
|2× Diamond
|200,000x
|-

|-
!scope="row"|Venezuela (APFV)
|Gold
|10,000x

See also 
List of number-one Billboard Latin Albums from the 2010s
List of number-one Billboard Latin Pop Albums from the 2010s

Release history

References 

Carlos Vives albums
2013 albums
Sony Music Latin albums
Sony Music albums
Sony Music Colombia albums
Latin Grammy Award for Best Tropical Fusion Album